The Jasper E. Treece Building is a historic farm outbuilding in rural eastern Searcy County, Arkansas. It is a modest single-story stone structure, with a corrugated metal gable roof. The only openings in its walls are the doorway in the eastern facade, which has a wooden plank door, and a small opening on the north side. The walls are eighteen inches thick. The building was built in 1898 for Jasper Treece by the Cypert brothers, local stonemasons, and was intended for use as a storage facility for non-perishable items, with granary space in the attic. It is of unusually high quality for a typically utilitarian structure.

The building was listed on the National Register of Historic Places in 1993.

See also
National Register of Historic Places listings in Searcy County, Arkansas

References

Agricultural buildings and structures on the National Register of Historic Places in Arkansas
Buildings and structures in Searcy County, Arkansas
National Register of Historic Places in Searcy County, Arkansas